Bostan Khan (died 1825), was a warrior of the Tareen (or Tarin) tribe settled in the Haripur, Hazara region of what was to later become the North-West Frontier Province (now Khyber Pakhtunkhwa), who was executed for rebellion by the Sikh administrators of the region at that time.

Early life
Sardar Bostan Khan was the nephew of the clan's chief of that time, Sardar Muhammad Khan. After the Sardar of Tareens was captured for rebelling against the Sikh Khalsa government of Lahore, in year 1824-25, he was arrested.

Struggle and death
After Sardar Muhammad Khan Tareen's capture his nephew, Sardar Bostan Khan, resumed the freedom struggle and went into rebellion against the Sikh Khalsa administrators. A small Sikh fort in Sirikot in Gandgarh district was attacked and taken by the rebels under Bostan Khan. At this time, the Sikh general Sardar Hari Singh Nalwa returned to his jagir Hazara in order to quell this rebellion with the help of a French General Duarte commanding a sizable force of fresh reinforcements from Peshawar. By now, the Sikhs had made up their minds and Hari Singh paid Rupees 50,000 as a tribute to the Maharaja Ranjit Singh in Lahore, to get the custody of Sardar Muhammad Khan Tareen, and had him poisoned to death. At the same time, he had Bostan Khan and some other rebels like Jalal Khan Dilazak, two principal Maliks of the Mashwanis one of them, Qasim Shah Mashwani, Sheikha Jadoon, and Sher Khan Swati blown by cannons at Haripur. After this event, the anti-Sikh movement in Hazara region ended only to emerge in form of ineffective skirmishes in Ovrush, Tanawal, Pakhli, Konsh and Balakot.

Later events
Late Sardar Muhammad Khan Tareen had a son, Sardar Ghulam Khan, who for a time from 1826 to 1848 became chief of Tareen in this region but later during the Second Anglo-Sikh War, he was arrested by the British and taken to Allahabad jail, and later hanged there. As a result of the rebellion of the Tareen/Tarins of lower Hazara, they suffered heavy punitive damages under orders of Major James Abbott (Indian Army officer) and were deprived of many of their estates which were confiscated and many of their chieftains and headmen exiled and executed.

References

Pashtun people
People from Haripur District
1825 deaths
Year of birth unknown